Cody Kevin Hall (born January 6, 1988) is an American former professional baseball pitcher. He made his Major League Baseball (MLB) debut with the San Francisco Giants in 2015 and has also played for the Miami Marlins.

Career

San Francisco Giants
Hall played college baseball at Southern University and A&M College. He was drafted by the San Francisco Giants in the 19th round of the 2011 Major League Baseball Draft. The Giants added Hall to their 40-man roster on November 20, 2014, and he made his major league debut on September 2, 2015.

Arizona Diamondbacks
Hall was claimed off waivers by the Arizona Diamondbacks on January 13, 2016.

Miami Marlins
He was then claimed off waivers by the Miami Marlins on May 18, 2016. He was released on August 14, 2016.

Lancaster Barnstormers
On March 28, 2017, Hall signed with the Lancaster Barnstormers of the Atlantic League of Professional Baseball.

Second Stint with Giants
On June 26, 2017, Hall signed a minor league deal with the San Francisco Giants. He elected free agency on November 6, 2017.

Tampa Bay Rays
On December 8, 2017, Hall signed a minor league contract with the Tampa Bay Rays. He was released on June 24, 2018.

References

External links

1988 births
Living people
Baseball players from Savannah, Georgia
Major League Baseball pitchers
San Francisco Giants players
Miami Marlins players
Southern Jaguars baseball players
Salem-Keizer Volcanoes players
Augusta GreenJackets players
San Jose Giants players
Richmond Flying Squirrels players
Scottsdale Scorpions players
Caribes de Anzoátegui players
Sacramento River Cats players
Reno Aces players
New Orleans Zephyrs players
Lancaster Barnstormers players
American expatriate baseball players in Venezuela